Barbara Lerner Spectre (born 1942) is an academic and philosophy lecturer, who is the founding director of Paideia, the European Institute for Jewish Studies in Sweden, a non-denominational academic institute established in 2001.

Biography
Barbara Spectre was born in Madison, Wisconsin. She studied philosophy and received a Bachelor of Arts degree at Columbia University and a Master of Arts degree at NYU, attaining a PhD in Philosophy at Bar-Ilan University. She married Rabbi Philip Spectre, and the couple moved in 1967 to Ashkelon, Israel, where she served on the faculty of Jewish Studies at Achva College of Education.  After moving to Jerusalem in 1982, she served on the philosophy faculty of the Shalom Hartman Institute of Jerusalem, the Melton Center of the Hebrew University, and Yellin College of Education, where she was cited as Outstanding Lecturer 1995–1997. She was the founding chairperson of the Schechter Institute in Jerusalem in 1984.  She served as a scholar in residence for the United Synagogues, Midwest Regions in 1987, 1990, 1992, 1996, and has lectured extensively throughout the United States.

In 1999, she emigrated to Sweden, settling in Stockholm and joining her husband, who was then serving as the Rabbi of the Stockholm Synagogue. The following year, she applied to the Swedish government for the government-funded formation of Paideia, the European Institute for Jewish Studies, which she has continued to direct. In its first decade of existence (2001-2011), Paideia trained over 200 persons from 35 countries for leadership positions in the renewal of Jewish culture in Europe.

Awards 
  The King's Medal in gold of the 8th size (Kon:sGM8, 2018) for prominent efforts for the Jewish culture in Sweden and abroad

Publications
 "Educating Jewish Leaders in a Pan-European Perspective", International Handbook of Jewish Education, Springer, 2011
 A Different Light: The Hannukah Book of Celebration, Two Volumes, co-editor with Noam Zion, Devora Press, 2000.
 PhD, Bar-Ilan University, Philosophy, "Models of Theological Response to the Holocaust in Christian and Jewish Thought"

References

Further reading
 "Don’t Write Off European Jewry". The Jewish Week.
 "Recognizing Antisemitism Is the First Step to Fighting It". Algemeiner Journal.
 "Visions of Venice". The Jerusalem Report. Quote: "... Institute, a fascinating experiment in Jewish education created by Barbara Spectre, an American-Israeli, with funding from the Swedish government...the curriculum is pluralistic and eclectic goes without saying. Barbara Spectre - who ...". 
 "A Smorgasbord of Empowerment". The Jerusalem Report. Quote: "Cofounded by Dr. Barbara Spectre, a pleasant, relaxed, 67-year- old American-born Conservative Jew who is a professional educator, and several ...". 
 A Century of Commitment. p. 207.

External links 

 European Institute of Jewish Studies in Sweden - Staff

1942 births
American emigrants to Sweden
20th-century American Jews
Academic staff of the Hebrew University of Jerusalem
Barnard College alumni
Jewish women
Judaic scholars
Living people
People from Madison, Wisconsin
Swedish Jews
21st-century American Jews